St. Aloysius College, Thrissur is government aided college situated in Elthuruth, Thrissur, Kerala. It is a first grade college affiliated to the University of Calicut. It is run by the congregation of Carmelites of Mary Immaculate (CMI). The college is administered by St. Mary's Monastery, a house under the Devamatha Province of the congregation.
 The college has Seven undergraduate courses (Physics, Mathematics, Chemistry, Zoology, Gemmology, Economics and Commerce) and five post-graduate courses (Economics, English, Chemistry, Zoology and Commerce).

History

The college was sanctioned by the Government of Kerala by the order G.O. Ms 40/69/Edn dt. 21.1.69 and was given provisional affiliation to the Kerala University on 27 June 1968 and permanent affiliation was accorded to the College by the University of Calicut on 15 March 1971. In July 1978, the college was upgraded with B.A. Economics. The college obtained U.G.C. affiliation in April 1984. The college was accredited at the B+ level in 2004.

Rankings 

The university was ranked 54th among Indian universities by the National Institutional Ranking Framework (NIRF) in 2020 and 76th overall.

Courses 
Gemmology
Commerce
English
Statistics
History
Economics
Physics
Chemistry
Zoology
Political Science
Psychology
Nursery and Ornamental Fish Farming
Jewellery Designing 
Management Studies
Multimedia

Additional subjects 

Malayalam
Physical Education
Hindi

Service Wing 
NCC
NSS
WWS
SSP
ASAP

Notable alumni
 Rosshan Andrrews, Malayalam Film Director
 Rajaji Mathew Thomas, Former Member of Kerala Legislative Assembly 
 Jayaraj Warrier, Actor
 Sreejith Ravi, Actor

References

External links 
Official Website

Educational institutions established in 1968
Colleges affiliated with the University of Calicut
Catholic universities and colleges in India
Colleges in Thrissur